Taisto is a Finnish word which is used as a masculine given name. People with the name include:

 Taisto Halonen (born 1960), Finnish wrestler 
 Taisto Kangasniemi (1924–1997), Finnish wrestler
 Taisto Laitinen (born 1933), Finnish athlete
 Taisto Lempinen (1914–1970), Finnish wrestler
 Taisto Mäki (1910–1979), Finnish athlete 
 Taisto Miettinen (born 1965), Finnish athlete
 Taisto Reimaluoto (born 1961), Finnish actor
 Taisto Sinisalo (1926–2002), Finnish communist politician
 Taisto Tähkämaa (born 1924), Finnish politician

See also
 Taistoism

Finnish masculine given names
Finnish words and phrases